Arlette Cousture,  (born April 3, 1948) is a Canadian writer. She writes historical fiction, often depicting the lives of women in Quebec. Many of her novels have become best-sellers in the French language.

Early life

Cousture was born in Saint-Lambert, Quebec, Canada. She graduated with a Bachelor of Arts from collège Sainte-Marie.

Career
As a young woman, Cousture worked at Radio-Canada television. She later worked in radio and as a journalist. She worked in communications at Hydro Quebec.

In the 1980s Cousture wrote a pair of best-selling novels, Les filles de Caleb, about the life of a young teacher in rural Quebec.  The stories later became the basis of a television series and were translated into English. Cousture later wrote more stories about the novels' heroine, Emilie.

In the 1990s Cousture wrote a two-volume story, Ces Enfants d'ailleurs, about a Polish family's move to Canada during World War II.

Awards and honours
In 1998, she was made an Officer of the Order of Canada. In 2012, she was made a Knight of the National Order of Quebec.

References

External links

 

1948 births
Living people
Writers from Quebec
Officers of the Order of Canada
Canadian screenwriters in French
Canadian women screenwriters
Knights of the National Order of Quebec
People from Saint-Lambert, Quebec